Cricklewood Green is the fourth studio album by blues rock band Ten Years After, released in 1970.

Reception

Allmusic gave Cricklewood Green a firmly positive retrospective review, praising each individual track and summarizing that "the band and engineer Andy Johns mix studio tricks and sound effects, blues-based song structures, a driving rhythm section, and Alvin Lee's signature lightning-fast guitar licks into a unified album that flows nicely from start to finish."

Track listing
All songs written by Alvin Lee

Side one
"Sugar the Road" – 3:59
"Working on the Road" – 4:15
"50,000 Miles Beneath My Brain" – 7:37
"Year 3,000 Blues" – 2:17

Side two
"Me and My Baby" – 4:12
"Love Like a Man" – 7:29
"Circles" – 3:55
"As the Sun Still Burns Away" – 4:42

CD reissue bonus tracks
"Warm Sun" – 3:08
"To No One" – 3:49

Charts

Personnel
Ten Years After
Alvin Lee – guitar, vocals
Leo Lyons – bass
Ric Lee – drums
Chick Churchill – organ, piano and harpsichord

References

1970 albums
Ten Years After albums
Chrysalis Records albums
Deram Records albums
Albums produced by Alvin Lee
Albums recorded at Olympic Sound Studios